Lemon Tree is a rural suburb of the Central Coast Council local government area in the Central Coast region of New South Wales, Australia.

References

Suburbs of the Central Coast (New South Wales)